Riddleberger is a surname. Notable people with the surname include:

Denny Riddleberger (born 1945), American Major League Baseball pitcher
Harrison H. Riddleberger (1844–1890), American lawyer, newspaper editor and politician
James Williams Riddleberger (1904–1982), American diplomat and career foreign service officer